"Volverte A Ver" (English: See you again) is a song written and performed by Colombian singer-songwriter Juanes. The song is the second radio single (after "Nada Valgo Sin Tu Amor") from his third studio album, Mi Sangre. The video for the single, directed by Gustavo Garzón won the Latin Grammy Award for Best Short Form Music Video at the Latin Grammy Awards of 2005.

Track listing
"Volverte A Ver" – 3:37 (Juan Esteban Aristizabal)

Chart performance

References

2005 singles
Juanes songs
Songs written by Juanes
Rock ballads
Song recordings produced by Gustavo Santaolalla
2004 songs
Universal Music Latino singles
Latin Grammy Award for Best Short Form Music Video